Indian Lake is a lake in South Kingstown, Washington County, Rhode Island.

References

Lakes of Rhode Island
Bodies of water of Washington County, Rhode Island
South Kingstown, Rhode Island